Sprite Creek is a creek that converges with East Canada Creek.

Sprite Creek may also refer to:

 Sprite Creek (Caroga Creek tributary), in Fulton County, New York